Winburg is a small mixed farming town in the Free State province of South Africa.

It is the oldest proclaimed town (1837) in the Orange Free State, South Africa and thus along with Griquastad, one of the oldest settlements in South Africa located north of the Orange River.

It is situated where the N1 National Highway (which goes north to Johannesburg and south to Cape Town) meets the N5 National Route (which goes east to Harrismith). The nearest city, Bloemfontein, is 120 km away southwards via the N1.

History
A small group of 11 Voortrekker settlers, led by Andries Hendrik Potgieter, first arrived in the area of Winburg in 1835.

They were able to buy access to the land between the Vaal and Vet rivers – virtually the entire northern part of what is now the Free State – from the local Bataung Chief, Makwana, in 1836, by promising protection from rival tribes and offering 42 head of cattle.

Within a year, more than 1,000 settler families had gathered in the region, making the need for an administrative and religious centre urgent. But the Voortrekker leaders disagreed over where to establish such a town. In 1841 a vote was held, with Andries Pretorius's group winning and electing to establish the town in its current position, on what was then the farm Waaifontein ("windy spring"), owned by Jacobus de Beer. Legend has it that the new town was named Wenburg ("victory town") to commemorate this, and holds that the site nominated by the losers is today still called Mompeling ("muttering"). Alternative explanations suggest the name commemorates the 1837 Voortrekker victory over the Ndebele.

Prior to 1843 Winburg formed part of the Boer Republic of Natalia (Port Natal, Pietermaritzburg).  Following the British annexation of Natal in 1843, Winburg became the first capital of the Voortrekker republic of the Orange Free State. Winburg was granted municipal status in 1872, by which time the capital had been moved to Bloemfontein. Winburg continued, however, to act as a settlement and religious centre for the local settlers.

The town was originally selected as the site for the main Voortrekker Monument, but Pretoria won favour and a five-tiered secondary Voortrekker monument was built on the outskirts of Winburg instead in the 1950s. It carries the names of the Voortrekker leaders: Piet Uys, Andries Hendrik Potgieter, Andries Pretorius, Piet Retief and Gerrit Maritz. The lengths of the five tiers are proportional to the distances travelled by the respective settler groups. The monument is built near the site of the birth-house of Martinus Theunis Steyn, who was president of the Boer Republic of the Orange Free State.

Boer War

The town was the site of a concentration camp for women and children captured by the British Army during their scorched earth campaign during the Second Boer War. 355 children and 132 adults died in this camp due to malnutrition and contagious diseases, while kept in tents without any infrastructure or protection during the bitter cold winters of 1899–1901.

The famous Boer General Koos de la Rey was born in the district of Winburg on the farm Doornfontein. General De La Rey was the leading Boer General of the Western Transvaal in 1899–1901.

Winburg had a black armed commando supporting the British soldiers during the war.

Local politics
The first shots of the Maritz Rebellion in 1914, against the government's involvement in South West Africa, were fired in the district of Winburg.

The first President of the Republic of South Africa, when it gained independence from the United Kingdom in 1961, was Charles Robberts Swart, who was born and went to school in Winburg.

The white community of Winburg is famous for the differences in political heritage. The town was divided into two camps, due to their support to either the South African Party of General Jan Smuts, or the National Party of Dr Daniel François Malan. This led to the division of the Dutch Reformed Church into two separate congregations, Klip Kerk (Stone Church, because it was built from sandstone) and which was the original church for the Dutch Reformed Church and Rietfontein Kerk. Bitter feuds were fought between supporters of the two parties. The Klipkerk supporters demolished the Rietfontein Church project several times.

In later years this division was almost erased. The National Party's support and later abdication to the African National Congress, led to a new division in the community. Old feuds were re-ignited and with the town divided along religious lines again, a new church, the Afrikaans Protestant Church, was formed.

The communities in Winburg, as in most South African towns, still lead segregated lives, a remnant of apartheid days. Social interaction between different population groups is being encouraged by an official integration policy of the African National Congress government. However this has led to the deteriorations of many facilities in Winburg, of which the previous prestigious school and orphanage, are two examples.

Economy 
 
The town's economy is dwindling and it is just a ghost town to what it was before 1994. Winburg was a very neat town, known for its good school, concrete streets, sandstone church, orphanage, fully equipped hospital, many professional inhabitants and businesses, agricultural co-operations, yogurt milk and butter factories, good community health services, social support structures, quality sport and recreational facilities, caravan park, hotels and Rietfontein water reservoir in the Laaispruit and the Voortrekker Monument and museum. The current state of maintenance of these facilities is evident to every tourist: The museum and monument are deteriorating and no plan is envisaged to save them for future generations.

The majority of the people are solely financially supported by the government grants funded by the taxpayer for the poor. There are only full-time employment opportunities for about 2% of the people. The ANC government did no investment into rural towns to create employment opportunities since 1994.

See also

 Eerste Pastorie Winburg

References

Populated places established in 1837
Populated places in the Masilonyana Local Municipality
Second Boer War concentration camps
1837 establishments in South Africa